Ahmad Kamil is an Indonesian justice who is the second Deputy Chief Justice of the Supreme Court of Indonesia for non-judicial affairs.

Kamil's term as Deputy Chief Justice lasted from 2009 to 2014. He ran for judicial election for a second term in the position, but lost to his successor Suwardi, receiving only 19 versus Suwardi's 28 out of the votes from their 47 peers on the court.

References

Living people
Year of birth missing (living people)
Justices of the Supreme Court of Indonesia
21st-century Indonesian judges